was a town located in Nishiuwa District, Ehime Prefecture, Japan.

As of 2003, the town had an estimated population of 3,863 and a density of 114.90 persons per km2. The total area was 33.62 km2.

On April 1, 2005, Misaki, along with the town of Seto (also from Nishiuwa District), was merged into the expanded town of Ikata.

Dissolved municipalities of Ehime Prefecture
Ikata, Ehime